John O'Brien (born 1962 in Tunbridge, Vermont) is an American film director, sheep farmer, Justice of the Peace and politician. In 2015, John was elected to the Town of Tunbridge, Vermont selectboard.

O'Brien is the director of the Tunbridge Trilogy, three films that focus on the rural life of Tunbridge, Vermont. The director refers to his style of filmmaking as "community cinema" and his films as "anthropological comedies" as his cast consists mostly of local friends and neighbors from Tunbridge who play themselves in fictional stories. The most famous of these, Man with a Plan, starred the dairy farmer and one-time politician, Fred Tuttle. According to O'Brien, the film, in which Tuttle runs successfully for Congress, was inspired by 1979's Being There, a movie in which Peter Sellers plays a gardener named Chance, who becomes a trusted adviser to the presidency. In 2001, it was reported that Man With a Plan had sold 40,000 copies, most of them to Vermonters. O'Brien's other films include Vermont Is for Lovers and Nosey Parker.

O'Brien graduated from Harvard University in 1986.

In 2018, O'Brien was the successful Democratic nominee for a seat in the Vermont House of Representatives.

Filmography
 The Big Dis (1989)
 Vermont Is for Lovers (1992)
 Man with a Plan (1996)
 Nosey Parker (2003)

References
 Filmmakers Redux: Then and Now
 Interview with Vermont Filmmaker John O'Brien
 John O'Brien's Company, Bellwether Films

Notes

External links
 

1962 births
Living people
Harvard University alumni
People from Tunbridge, Vermont
Film directors from Vermont
Democratic Party members of the Vermont House of Representatives